Jeffrey Lynn Walker (born January 22, 1963), known as Jeff Walker, is a former National Football League player. He was an offensive lineman for the San Diego Chargers in the 1986 season and New Orleans Saints in the 1988 and 1989 seasons.

In October 2011, he pleaded guilty to wire fraud and tax evasion charges.

References

External links

Memphis Tigers football players
San Diego Chargers players
New Orleans Saints players
American football offensive linemen
1963 births
Living people